CILT-FM (96.7 MHz), branded as Mix 96, is a radio station broadcasting a hot adult contemporary/classic hits format, similar to CKNO-FM in Edmonton. Licensed to Steinbach, Manitoba, it serves southeastern Manitoba, even to Winnipeg. It first began broadcasting in 1998 with an adult contemporary format as Lite 96.7. The station is currently owned by Golden West Broadcasting.  By 2006, the station changed formats to hot adult contemporary/classic hits under the branding Mix 96.7.

References

External links
Mix 96.7
 

Ilt
Ilt
Ilt
Mass media in Steinbach, Manitoba
Radio stations established in 1998
1998 establishments in Manitoba